Maximilian Sforza (Italian: Massimiliano Sforza; 25 January 1493 – 25 May 1530) was a Duke of Milan from the Sforza family, the son of Ludovico Sforza. He was installed as a ruler of Milan in 1512 after the capture of Milan by the Holy League, supported by a Swiss militia led by Jakob Meyer zum Hasen. He ruled from 1512 to 1515, between the occupations of Louis XII of France (1500–1512), and Francis I of France in 1515. After the French victory at the Battle of Marignano, Maximilian was imprisoned by the returning French troops.

When Maximilian was three his father tried to arrange a marriage between him and Mary Tudor, the younger daughter of King Henry VII of England. However, Henry VII rejected the proposal citing Mary's young age as the issue.

Ancestors

See also
Italian Wars

References

Sources

1493 births
1530 deaths
Maximilian Sforza
Maximilian Sforza
Military leaders of the Italian Wars
16th-century Italian nobility